Necron may refer to:

 Necron (comics), a 1981-1985 adult comic series
 Necron (Warhammer 40,000), a fictional undead alien race
 Necron (Final Fantasy), a villain from Final Fantasy IX
 Nekron, a DC Comics supervillain
 Nekron, a villain from the 1983 animated film Fire and Ice
 Necron, a demon from the two-part Charmed episode "A Witch's Tail"

See also
 Necrom, a fictional character appearing in American comic books published by Marvel Comics